The Union may refer to:

Politics
 The Union (Germany) or CDU/CSU, the partnership of the German political parties the Christian Democratic Union and the Christian Social Union
 The Union (Italy), a former coalition of political parties in Italy
 The European Union, a political and economic union of 27 member states primarily in Europe
 The Soviet Union, a federal socialist state that spanned much of Europe and Asia from 1922 to 1991
 Union Government (India), government created by the constitution of India as the central legislative, executive, and judicial authority
 The United Kingdom, a sovereign country that includes Great Britain, Northern Ireland, and many islands within the British Isles
 The United States, a country primarily located in North America comprising 50 states and several territories, districts, and possessions
 Union (American Civil War), the federal government of the United States and the states loyal to it during the American Civil War (1861–1865)

Film
 The Union (2011 film), a 2011 documentary film by Cameron Crowe
 The Union: The Business Behind Getting High, a 2007 documentary about the Canadian marijuana industry
 A fictional company in the 2010 science fiction film Repo Men

Books and newspapers
 The Union (James Bond), a fictional criminal organization in three Raymond Benson novels 
 The Union (Marvel Team), a Marvel Comics UK superhero team and Marvel comic book series
 The Union (newspaper), a newspaper in Grass Valley, California, United States
 The Union or Ohio Enterprise, a newspaper for African Americans established in Cincinnati, Ohio by Wendell Dabney

Music
 The Union (Elton John and Leon Russell album), 2010
 The Union (band), an English rock band formed in 2009
 The Union (The Union album), their 2010 album
 The Union (The Glorious Sons album), a 2014 rock album

Other uses
 Cambridge Union, a debating and free speech society in Cambridge, England
 Oxford Union, a debating society in the city of Oxford, England, drawn primarily from the University of Oxford
 The Union (professional wrestling), a stable of wrestlers in the late 1990s
 International Union Against Tuberculosis and Lung Disease, a global scientific organization headquartered in Paris

See also
 Union (disambiguation)
 
 
 Acts of Union 1707, law creating the Kingdom of Great Britain
 Acts of Union 1801, law creating the United Kingdom of Great Britain and Ireland
 Perpetual Union, legal concept that binds the various U.S. states together as one nation